Praprot is a small village southeast of Semič in southeast Slovenia. The area is part of the historical region of Lower Carniola. The municipality is now included in the Southeast Slovenia Statistical Region.

References

External links
Praprot at Geopedia

Populated places in the Municipality of Semič